Kowslar (also Romanized as Kows̄lar and Kūs̄lar) is a village in Jafarbay-ye Sharqi Rural District, Gomishan District, Torkaman County, Golestan Province, Iran. At the 2006 census, its population was 228, in 45 families.

References 

Populated places in Torkaman County